Gordon H. Butler Sr. (February 2, 1889 – August 1, 1964) was an American businessman and politician.

Early life and education 
Butler was born in Scipio, Indiana, and graduated from Purdue University in 1913 with a bachelor's degree in civil engineering. He also went to University of London in 1918 and 1919.

Career 
Butler moved to Duluth, Minnesota with his wife and family in 1914 and was a civil engineer and general contractor for the concrete business. He served in the United States Army Corps of Engineers during World War I and World War II and was commissioned a major. Butler served in the Minnesota Senate from 1951 until his death in 1964.

References

1889 births
1964 deaths
People from Jennings County, Indiana
Politicians from Duluth, Minnesota
Military personnel from Minnesota
United States Army Corps of Engineers personnel
American civil engineers
Purdue University alumni
Alumni of the University of London
Minnesota state senators